Orłów-Kolonia  is a village in the administrative district of Gmina Bedlno, within Kutno County, Łódź Voivodeship, in Central Poland. It lies approximately  South of Bedlno,  Southeast of Kutno, and  North of the regional capital Łódź.

References

Villages in Kutno County